Kinyongia boehmei is species of chameleon, a lizard in the family Chamaeleonidae. The IUCN Red List gives two alternative English common names for this species: Taita blade-horned chameleon and Böhme's two-horned chameleon. The species is endemic to Kenya.

Etymology
The specific name, boehmei, is in honor of German herpetologist Wolfgang Böhme.

Geographic range

Habitat
The preferred natural habitat of K. boehmei is forest.

Behavior
K. boehmi is arboreal, living in the forest canopy.

Reproduction
K. boehmei is oviparous.

References

Further reading
Lutzmann, Nicolà; Nečas, Petr (2002). "Zum Status von Bradypodion tavetanum (Steindachner, 1891) aus den Taita Hills, Kenia, mit Beschreibung einer neuen Unterart (Reptilia: Sauria: Chamaeleonidae) [= On the status of Bradypodion tavetanum (Steindachner, 1891) from the Taita Hills, Kenya, with description of a new subspecies (Reptilia: Sauria: Chamaeleonidae)]". Salamandra 38 (1): 5–14. (Bradypodion tavetanum boehmi, new subspecies, pp. 6–11, Figures 1–4). (in German, with an abstract in English, and bilingual figure captions).
Mariaux, Jean; Lutzmann, Nicolà; Stipala, Jan (2008). "The two-horned chamaeleons of East Africa". Zoological Journal of the Linnean Society 152 (2): 367–391. (Kinyongia boehmei, new status).
Tilbury, Colin R.; Tolley, Krystal A.; Branch, William R. (2006). "A review of the systematics of the genus Bradypodion (Sauria: Chamaeleonidae), with the description of two new genera". Zootaxa 1363: 23–38. (Kinyongia tavetana boehmei, new combination).

Kinyongia
Reptiles described in 2002
Reptiles of Kenya
Endemic fauna of Kenya